Bishwaishwar 'Cammie' Ramsaroop (28 November 1939 - 16 August 2021) was a Guyanese politician from People's National Congress. Prior to his political career, he was a teacher and minister in the Forbes Burnham administration.
From October 1980 to September 1984 he was one of the Vice Presidents.  Ramsaroop played a pivotal role in the establishment of Trinidad and Tobago's first diplomatic mission with the creation of the Guyana High Commission on Alexandra Street, Port-of-Spain in February 2020.

References

1939 births
2021 deaths
Indo-Guyanese people
People's National Congress (Guyana) politicians
Vice presidents of Guyana
Members of the National Assembly (Guyana)
Government ministers of Guyana